Kako Band is an Iranian new-style integrative and vocal Fusion band. In 2013 Kako band produced and released its first album called Invite
The band has also performed the soundtrack of the Iranian TV show Aspirin called Fall. They sing in  idioglossia and/or conlang.

References

Electronic music groups
Iranian indie rock groups
World music groups
Iranian musical groups